This is a list of the monarchs of Armenia, rulers of the ancient Kingdom of Armenia (336 BC – AD 428), the medieval Kingdom of Armenia (884–1045), various lesser Armenian kingdoms (908–1170), and finally the Armenian Kingdom of Cilicia (1198–1375). Also included are prominent vassal princes and lords who ruled during times without an Armenian kingdom, as well as later claimants to the position.

Ancient Armenia (521 BC – AD 428)

Early satraps (521–401 BC) 

Hydarnes I, satrap in the late 6th century BC?, granted Armenia by the Achaemenid king Darius I as a semi-hereditary satrapy 
 Hydarnes II, satrap in the early 5th century BC?
Hydarnes III, satrap in the middle of the 5th century BC 
Terituchmes, satrap in the second half of the 5th century BC

Orontid dynasty (401–200 BC) 

Orontes I "the Bactrian", satrap 401–344 BC, matrilineal? descendant of Hydarnes I
 Artashata, satrap ?–before 338 BC (non-dynastic), later Achaemenid king as Darius III 336–330 BC 
 Orontes II, satrap before 338 BC, king 336–331 BC?, son or grandson of Orontes I – first ruler to rule as king
 Mithrenes, satrap 331–321 BC, son of Orontes II?, appointed satrap by Alexander the Great
 Neoptolemus, satrap 323–321 BC (non-dynastic) 
 Orontes III, c. 317–260 BC, son of Orontes II?
 Sames, c. 260 BC, son of Orontes III?
 Arsames, c. 260–c. 228 BC, son of Sames?
 Xerxes, 228–c. 212 BC, son of Arsames 
 Orontes IV, 212–200 BC, son of Arsames?
The Orontid dynasty lost its power in Armenia following a 200 BC revolt instigated by the Seleucid Empire. The Armenian lands were then incorporated into the Seleucid Empire under three vassal strategoi (military governors): Artaxias (Greater Armenia), Zariadres (Sophene) and Mithridates (Lesser Armenia). Armenian royal power was re-established after a decade of vassalage by Artaxias.

Artaxiad dynasty (200 BC–AD 2) 

 Artaxias I, strategos 200–c. 190 BC, king c. 190–c. 160 BC, possibly part of a branch of the Orontid dynasty
 Artavasdes I, c. 160–c. 120 BC, son of Artaxias I
 Tigranes I, c. 120–c. 95 BC, son of Artavasdes I
 Tigranes II "the Great", 96/95–56/55 BC, son of Tigranes I
 Artavasdes II, 56–34/30 BC, son of Tigranes II
 Artaxias II, 34/30–20 BC, son of Artavasdes II
 Tigranes III, 20–8 BC, son of Artavasdes II
 Tigranes IV and Erato (first reign) 8–5 BC, son and daughter of Tigranes III
 Artavasdes III, 5–2 BC, son of Artavasdes II
 Tigranes IV and Erato (second reign), 2 BC–AD 1
 Erato (alone), 1–2

Non-dynastic kings (2–61) 

This period of time saw conflict between the Roman and Parthian empires result in rapid appointments and depositions of Armenian client kings by both sides.

 Ariobarzanes, 2–4, a Median prince and matrilineal descendant of Tigranes II
 Artavasdes IV, 4–6, son of Ariobarzanes
 Tigranes V, 6–12, a Herodian prince
 Vonones, 12–18, former king of the Parthian Empire
 Artaxias III, 18–34, a Pontic prince
 Arsaces (Arshak I), 34–35, son of the Parthian king Artabanus II 
 Mithridates (first reign), 35–37, brother of the Iberian king Pharasmanes I 
 Orodes, 37–41, son of the Parthian king Artabanus II 
 Mithridates (second reign), 41–52 
 Rhadamistus, 52–54, son of the Iberian king Pharasmanes I
 Tiridates I (first reign), 54–58, son of the Parthian king Vonones II
 Tigranes VI, 51–61/62, nephew of Tigranes V

Arsacid dynasty (61–428) 

 Tiridates I (second reign), c. 61/66–c. 75/88
 Sanatruk, c. 75/88–c. 110, son of Tiridates I?
 Axidares, c. 110–c. 112, son of the Parthian king Pacorus II
 Parthamasiris, c. 112–c. 114, son of the Parthian king Pacorus II
 Interregnum 114–117: Armenia is temporarily incorporated as a province of the Roman Empire
 Vologases I, 117–144, son of Sanatruk
 Sohaemus (first reign), 144–160, a Roman consul with Arsacid and Achaemenid heritage
 Aurelius Pacorus, 160–163, son of the Parthian king Vologases IV
 Sohaemus (second reign), 164–c. 180
 Vologases II, c. 180–190, son of the Parthian king Vologases IV, later ruled Parthia as Vologases V 190–208
 Khosrov I, c. 190–214/216, son of Vologases II
 Tiridates II, 217–252, son of Khosrov I
 Hormizd-Ardashir, 252/253– c. 270, son of the Sasanian king Shapur I; made king of Armenia by his father after the Sasanians conquered the kingdom, later king of the Sasanian Empire as Hormizd I
 Narseh, c. 270–293, brother of Hormizd-Ardashir, later king of the Sasanian Empire
 Khosrov II, 279/280–287 (in western Armenia), son of Tiridates II?, enthroned by the Romans after Narseh ceded parts of western Armenia to Emperor Probus
Tiridates (III), 287–298, brother of Khosrov II, initially king of only western Armenia but granted the rest of the kingdom as well after Narseh became king of the Sasanian Empire
Tiridates III (or IV) "the Great", 298–330, son of Khosrov II
Khosrov III "the Small", 330–338, son of Tiridates III
Sanesan, a Sasanian-backed usurper belonging to the Arsacid dynasty, held much of Armenia for about a year in circa 336.
Hannibalianus, son of Roman emperor Constantine I, was nominated by the Romans as king of Armenia in 335/336 but died in 337 without Khosrov III having been displaced.
Tiran (Tigranes VII), 338–350, son of Khosrov III
Arshak II, 350–368, son of Tiran
Pap, 368–374, son of Arshak II
 Varazdat, 374–378, nephew of Pap (perhaps son of Pap's younger brother Tiridates)
 Arshak III, c. 378–387 and Vologases III, c. 378–386, sons of Pap

The Sasanians appointed their own Armenian king (Khosrov IV) in 384, against the Roman-supported Arshak III, leading Armenia to becoming informally divided under the two kings. The division was made formal through an agreement between the Roman emperor Theodosius I and Sasanian king Shapur III in 387, which partitioned Armenia into a western (under Roman influence) and an eastern (under Sasanian influence) kingdom.

Kings in western Armenia (387–389) 

 Arshak III, 387–c. 389, former king of all of Armenia

Upon the death of Arshak III in 389, Emperor Theodosius I chose to not appoint another king, ending the western kingdom. The territories formerly ruled by Arshak were incorporated into the Roman Empire as a province.

Kings in eastern Armenia (384–428) 

 Khosrov IV, 384–389, son of Varazdat?
 Vramshapuh, 389/401–417, son of Varazdat?
 Khosrov V, 417–418, possibly the same person as Khosrov IV
 Shapur, 418–422, son of the Sasanian king Yazdegerd I, later king of the Sasanian Empire as Shapur IV
 Artaxias IV, 422–428, son of Vramshapuh

The Sasanian king Bahram V deposed the last eastern king, Artaxias IV, in 428 with the permission of the Armenian nobility and annexed his domains into the Sasanian Empire.

Vassal lords and princes (428–884)

Marzbāns in Sasanian Armenia (428–646) 

Following their deposition of the last Arsacid king Artaxias IV, the Sasanian Empire entrusted the rule of their Armenian territories to an official with the title marzbān, a title variously interpreted as governor-general or viceroy. The first marzbān, appointed by Bahram V, was the military officer Veh Mihr Shapur.

The list of marzbān is not entirely contiguous due to both periods without an appointed marzbān and gaps in the historical record. It was relatively common for the office to be vacant since the Sasanians periodically tried to assert more direct control.

 Veh Mihr Shapur, marzbān 428–442, Sasanian military officer
 Vasak Siwni, marzbān c. 442–451, Armenian noble
 Sahak II Bagratuni, insurgent marzbān 482–483, Armenian noble
 Vahan I Mamikonian, autonomous marzbān 485–505/510, Armenian noble
 Vard Mamikonian, autonomus marzbān 505/501–509/514, Armenian noble
 Mjej I Gnuni, marzbān 518–548, Armenian noble
 Philip Siwni, marzbān 574–576, Armenian noble
 Mushegh II Mamikonian, marzbān 591?, Armenian noble
 Varaztirots II Bagratuni, marzbān 628 – after 631, Armenian noble

Presiding princes of Armenia (628–884) 

The position of presiding prince of Armenia (formally "prince of the Armenians") was created by the Byzantine Empire in the 6th century in order to legitimize a local vassal leader with Byzantine backing and counteract Sasanian efforts in the region. During later centuries, the presiding princes wavered in allegiance between Byzantium and the Caliphates, who competed over influence. Most often they were largely autonomous tributary vassals. The earliest known presiding prince was Mjej II Gnuni, appointed by the Byzantines in the early 7th century.

 Mjej II Gnuni, 628–635 (for the Byzantine Empire)
 David Saharuni, 635–638 (for the Byzantine Empire)
 Theodore Rshtuni (first time), 638–c. 645 (for the Byzantine Empire)
 Varaztirots II Bagratuni, c. 645 (for the Byzantine Empire)
 Theodore Rshtuni (second time), 645–653 (for the Byzantine Empire), 653–655 (for the Rashidun Caliphate)
 Mushegh IV Mamikonian, 654 (for the Byzantine Empire)
 Hamazasp Mamikonian, 655–657 (for the Rashidun Caliphate), 657–658 (for the Byzantine Empire)
 Grigor I Mamikonian, 662–684/685 (for the Umayyad Caliphate)
 Ashot II Bagratuni, 686–689/690 (for the Umayyad Caliphate)
 Nerseh Kamsarakan, 689/690–691 (for the Byzantine Empire)
 Smbat VI Bagratuni, 691–697; 700–711 (for the Byzantine Empire), 697–700 (for the Umayyad Caliphate)
 Ashot III Bagratuni "the Blind", 732–748 (for the Umayyad Caliphate)
 Grigor II Mamikonian, 748–750 (for the Umayyad Caliphate)
 Mushegh VI Mamikonian, c. 750; head of insurgent members of the nobility
 Sahak III Bagratuni, c. 755–761 (for the Abbasid Caliphate)
 Smbat VII Bagratuni, 761–772 (for the Abbasid Caliphate)
 Tatzates Andzevatsi, 780–782/785 (for the Abbasid Caliphate)
 Ashot IV Bagratuni "the Carnivorous", 806–826 (for the Abbasid Caliphate)
 Smbat VIII Bagratuni "the Confessor", 826–855 (for the Abbasid Caliphate)
 Bagrat II Bagratuni, "Prince of Princes" 830–852 (for the Abbasid Caliphate)
 Ashot V Bagratuni "the Great", 856–884 (for the Appasid Caliphate); "Prince of Princes" in 856 and king in 884

Restored kingdom (884–1045)

Bagratuni dynasty (884–1045) 

After more than four centuries of dormancy, the Armenian kingdom was restored under the Bagratuni dynasty, which had already produced several vassal princes during the previous centuries. The Bagratuni princes were during their efforts to gain power of the other Armenian noble families supported by the Abbasid caliphs, who feared Byzantine influence in the region. In 884, the Bagratuni prince Ashot V was crowned king (as Ashot I) by his peers. His new position was recognised by both the Byzantine Empire and the Abbasid Caliphate; both Emperor Basil I and Caliph Al-Mu'tamid sent him a royal crown.

 Ashot I "the Great", 884–890, previously prince
 Smbat I "the Martyr", 890–913, son of Ashot I
 Ashot II "the Iron", 914–928, son of Smbat I
 Ashot of Bagaran, c. 915–920; usurper installed by Yusuf Ibn Abi'l-Saj
 Abas I, 928–953, son of Smbat I
 Ashot III "the Merciful", 953–977, son of Abas I
 Smbat II "the Conqueror", 977–989, son of Ashot III
 Gagik I, 989–1017/1020, son of Ashot III
 Hovhannes-Smbat III, 1017/1020–1040/1041 (in Ani), son of Gagik I
 Ashot IV "the Valiant", 1017/1020–1040/1041 (in Talin), son of Gagik I
 Gagik II, 1042–1045, son of Ashot IV

The Bagratid kingdom and its capital of Ani was conquered by the Byzantine Empire under Emperor Constantine IX Monomachos in 1045.

Lesser medieval Armenian kingdoms

Artsruni dynasty of Vaspurakan (908–1021) 

The Artsruni family were princes ruling in Vaspurakan under the Bagratids. They revolted against the Bagratuni dynasty after King Smbat I ceded some of their land to the nearby princes of Syunik and Vaspurakan became a separate kingdom under the Artsruni dynasty shortly thereafter in 908, after prince Gagik Artsruni was recognised as a king by Abbasid caliph.

 Gagik Artsruni, 908–937/943
 Derenik-Ashot Artsruni, 937/943–953, son of Gagik
 Abusahl-Hamazasp Artsruni, 953–969/972, son of Gagik
 Ashot-Sahak Artsruni, 969/972–991, son of Abusahl-Hamazasp
 Gurgen-Khachik Artsruni, 991–1003, son of Abusahl-Hamazasp
 Senekerim-Hovhannes Artsruni, 1003–1021, son of Abusahl-Hamazasp

Senekerim-Hovhannes, the last king of Vaspurakan, surrendered his crown to the Byzantine Empire in 1021 under pressure from incursions by the Seljuk Turks and resettled with his family in Cappadocia.

Bagratuni dynasty of Vanand (961–1065) 
The Kingdom of Vanand was created as a vassal state by the Bagratids in 961, ruled by members of their dynasty.

 Mushegh, 961/962–984, son of Abas I of Armenia
 Abas I, 984–1029, son of Mushegh
 Gagik-Abas II, 1029–1065, son of Abas I; claimed the position of king of all Armenia following the collapse of the main Bagratid kingdom in 1045.

Vanand was ceded to the Byzantine Empire by Gagik-Abas II in 1065.

Kiurikian dynasty of Tashir-Dzoraget (982–c. 1145) 

The Kingdom of Tashir-Dzoraget was a vassal kingdom founded in 982 by Kiuriki I, youngest son of Ashot III of Armenia, and thereafter ruled by his descendants. It was for most of its history ruled from the fortress of Lori.

 Kiurike I, 982–989, son of Ashot III of Armenia
 David I "the Landless", 989–1046/1048, son of Kiurike I
 Kiurike II, 1046/1048–1081/1089, son of David I
 David II and Abas, c. 1089–c. 1145, sons of Kiurike II

Tashir-Dzoraget was largely conquered by the Seljuk Turks in 1081/1089. In the early 12th century, further conqueste led to David II and Abas only retaining control of the fortress of Macnaberd. The kingdom was fully conquered by around 1145, though it is possible that some members of the Kiurikian dynasty retained control of fortresses and settlements in the region thereafter.

Siunia dynasty of Syunik (970–1170) 

The independent Kingdom of Syunik was established under the Siuni prince Smbat Sahak in 970.

 Smbat I Sahak, 970–998
 Vasak, 998–1019, son of Smbat I
 Smbat II, 1019–1044, cousin and nephew of Vasak
 Grigor I, 1044–1084, brother of Smbat II
 Senekerim Sevadian, 1084–1094, adoptive son of Grigor I
 Grigor II, 1094–1166,  son of Senekerim
 Hasan of Gerakar, 1166–1170, son-in-law of Grigor II

The Kingdom of Syunik was conquered by the Seljuk Turks in 1170.

Shah-i Armens (1100–1185; 1420–1437)

Ahlat Shah-i Armens (1100–1185) 

In the decades following the Battle of Manzikert (1071), one of the Turkmen vassal dynasties of the Seljuk Turks gained control of the city of Ahlat in the former Armenian heartland. These Muslim emirs took the title Shah-i Armen ("King of the Armenians"); the same title the Caliphates had previously used for the Bagratuni kings.

 Sökmen I, 1100–1111
 Zahireddin Ibrahim, 1111–1127
 Ahmed, 1127
 Sökmen II, 1128–1185

Sökmen II left no heirs and his death in 1185 terminated the Shah-i Armen dynastic line. Ahlat was thereafter ruled by a series of slave emirs; Seyfeddin Bektimur 1185–1193, Bedreddin Aksungur 1193–1198, Sücaeddin Kutlug 1198, Melukülmansur Muhammed 1198–1207, and Izzeddin Balaban 1207. The city's period of relative autonomy came to an end when it was captured by the Ayyubid Sultanate in 1207.

Qara Qoyunlu (1420–1437) 

The title Shah-i Armen was temporarily revived in the 15th century under the rule of the Turkmen Qara Qoyunlu, being used by Sultan Qara Iskander as part of his policy to cultivate the Armenian population, particularly the clergy and local nobility.

 Qara Iskander, 1420–1437

Armenian Kingdom of Cilicia (1080–1375) 

The Armenian Kingdom of Cilicia was a state formed in the Middle Ages by Armenian refugees who fled the Seljuk invasion of their homeland. It was initially ruled by the Rubenids, an offshoot of the Bagratuni dynasty. While the Rubenid rulers were initially regional princes, their close ties with the Western world after the First Crusade saw the principality recognised as a kingdom under Leo I by the Holy Roman Empire in 1198. The rulers of the Armenian Kingdom of Cilia thereafter styled themselves simply as "King of Armenia".

Rubenid dynasty (1080–1252) 

 Ruben I, prince 1080–1095
 Constantine I, prince 1095–1099, son of Ruben I
 Thoros I, prince 1100–1129, son of Constantine I
 Leo I, prince 1129–1138, son of Constantine I
 Interregnum 1138–1145: Cilicia was occupied by the Byzantine Empire
 Thoros II, prince 1145–1169, son of Leo I
 Ruben II, prince 1169–1170, son of Theodore II
 Mleh, prince 1170–1175, son of Leo I
 Ruben III, prince 1175–1186, grandson of Leo I
 Leo I "the Magnificent", prince (as Leo II) 1186–1198 and king 1198–1219, brother of Ruben III
 Isabella, 1219–1252, daughter of Leo I
 Philip of Antioch, 1222–1224, first husband and co-ruler of Isabella

Hethumid dynasty (1226–1341) 

The Hethumid dynasty gained power through marriage with Isabella of the Rubenid dynasty. Upon her death, her husband Hethum I became sole ruler and was followed as king by their descendants.

 Hethum I, 1226–1269, second husband of Isabella
 Leo II, 1269–1289, son of Hethum I and Isabella
 Hethum II (first reign), 1289–1293, son of Leo II
 Thoros, 1293–1294, son of Leo II
 Hethum II (second reign), 1294–1296
 Smbat IV, 1296–1298, son of Leo II
 Constantine I, 1298–1299, son of Leo II
 Hethum II (third reign), 1299–1305
 Leo III, 1305–1308, son of Thoros
 Oshin, 1308–1320, son of Leo II
 Leo IV, 1320–1341, son of Oshin

Lusignan and Neghir dynasties (1342–1375) 

After the death of Leo IV in 1341 his cousin Guy de Lusignan was elected to succeed him as Constantine II, beginning the rule of the Lusignan dynasty. This dynasty ruled for just over three decades before Cilicia was captured by the Mamluks, bringing an end to the kingdom.

 Constantine II, 1342–1344, cousin and chosen successor of Leo IV (House of Lusignan)
 Constantine III, 1344–1363, elected by the Armenian nobility; grandnephew of Hethum I (House of Neghir)
 Leo (V) "the Usurper", 1363–1365, unknown lineage; seized the throne and then abdicated after a reign of two years
 Constantine IV, 1365–1373, cousin of Constantine III (House of Neghir)
 Peter de Lusignan, King of Cyprus, was invited to become king by some Armenian barons in 1368 but died in 1369 while making preparations to cross the sea to Cilicia with his forces
 Marie of Korikos, regent 1373–1374, widow of Constantine III and Constantine IV; served as regent while delegations were sent to negotiate with prospective new candidates for the kingship
 Leo V (or VI), 1374–1375, nephew of Constantine II (House of Lusignan)

Later claimants

Lusignan claimants (1375–1489) 
The deposed Leo V continued to claim the title "King of Armenia" in exile until his death in 1393. His claims were then inherited by his distant cousin James I (both were great-grandsons of the Cypriot king Hugh III), who ruled as King of Cyprus. From 1393 to the end of the Cypriot kingdom in 1489, the rulers of Cyprus claimed the full title "King of Cyprus, Jerusalem and Armenia".

 Leo V, 1375–1393, former king of Armenia
 James I of Cyprus, 1393–1398, distant cousin of Leo V
 Janus of Cyprus, 1398–1432, son of James I
 John II of Cyprus, 1432–1458, son of Janus
 Charlotte of Cyprus, 1458–1464, daughter of John II
 James II of Cyprus, 1464–1473, son of John II
 James III of Cyprus, 1473–1474, son of James II
 Catherine Cornaro, 1474–1489, widow of James II and mother of James III

After the fall of the Kingdom of Cyprus in 1489, Catherine Cornaro sold her claims and titles (including her claim to Armenia) to the Republic of Venice, which at times thereafter advanced a shadowy claim to Cilicia or Armenia as a whole.

Savoyard claimants (1485–1946) 

Charlotte, who ruled as Queen of Cyprus 1458–1464, was deposed in 1464 but maintained claims to her dispossessed titles in exile. In 1485, Charlotte ceded her titular claims to her first cousin once removed Charles I, Duke of Savoy. As a consequence of Charlotte's sale, the House of Savoy is often seen as the heirs of the Lusignan kings of Cyprus and Armenian Cilicia. For centuries thereafter, the heads of the family maintained the style "Duke of Savoy and titular King of Cyprus, Jerusalem and Armenia". The title "King of Cyprus, Jerusalem and Armenia" was maintained even after the Savoyard dynasts became kings of Italy, for instance being used by both Victor Emmanuel II and Victor Emmanuel III.

 Charlotte of Cyprus, 1464–1485, former queen of Cyprus
 Charles I, Duke of Savoy, 1485–1490, first cousin once removed of Charlotte, ceded titles
 Charles II, Duke of Savoy, 1490–1496, son of Charles I
 Philip II, Duke of Savoy, 1496–1497, uncle of Charles I
 Philibert II, Duke of Savoy, 1497–1504, son of Philip II
 Charles III, Duke of Savoy, 1504–1553, son of Philip II
 Emmanuel Philibert, Duke of Savoy, 1553–1580, son of Charles III
 Charles Emmanuel I, Duke of Savoy, 1580–1630, son of Emmanuel Philibert
 Victor Amadeus I, Duke of Savoy, 1630–1637, son of Charles Emmanuel I
 Francis Hyacinth, Duke of Savoy, 1637–1638, son of Victor Amadeus I
 Charles Emmanuel II, Duke of Savoy, 1638–1675, son of Victor Amadeus I
 Victor Amadeus II of Sardinia, 1675–1730, son of Charles Emmanuel II
 Charles Emmanuel III of Sardinia, 1730–1773, son of Victor Amadeus II
 Victor Amadeus III of Sardinia, 1773–1796, son of Charles Emmanuel III
 Charles Emmanuel IV of Sardinia, 1796–1802, son of Victor Amadeus III
 Victor Emmanuel I of Sardinia, 1802–1821, son of Victor Amadeus III
 Charles Felix of Sardinia, 1821–1831, son of Victor Amadeus III
 Charles Albert of Sardinia, 1831–1849, great-great-grandson of Victor Amadeus I
 Victor Emmanuel II of Italy, 1849–1878, son of Charles Albert
 Umberto I of Italy, 1878–1900, son of Victor Emmanuel II
 Victor Emmanuel III of Italy, 1900–1946, son of Umberto I
 Umberto II of Italy, 1946, son of Victor Emmanuel III

See also
 List of Armenian royal consorts
 History of Armenia
 List of catholicoi of all Armenians

Notes

Lists of monarchs
Kings